Valerie McDonnell (born May 25, 2004) is an American politician serving as a member of the New Hampshire House of Representatives for the Rockingham 25th district. Elected in November 2022, she assumed office on December 7, 2022.

Early life 
Valerie McDonnell was born to parents Brian McDonnell and Pauline McDonnell in 2004. She is a native of Salem, New Hampshire

McDonnell graduated from Salem High School in 2022. She is a sophomore at Southern New Hampshire University, where she is majoring in political science with a minor in professional writing. In 2021 and 2022, McDonnell was the New Hampshire state champion and a National Finalist of the American Legion Oratorical Contest.

Career 
In 2022, McDonnell was elected to represent district 25 of the New Hampshire House of Representatives.

See also 

 List of the youngest state legislators in the United States

References 

2004 births
Living people
Republican Party members of the New Hampshire House of Representatives
People from Salem, New Hampshire
21st-century American women politicians
Women state legislators in New Hampshire